The 1998–99 Ranji Trophy was the 65th season of the Ranji Trophy. Karnataka won their third title in four years defeating Madhya Pradesh by 96 runs in the final.

In the final, Madhya Pradesh gained a first innings lead of 75 runs. The match was interrupted by rain on the fourth day, at the end of which Karnataka declared their second innings at 321 for 7. Madhya Pradesh needed 247 or alternately bat through the last day to win on first innings lead. They chose the latter option and were 130 for 4 wickets at tea. Vijay Bharadwaj dismissed the captain Chandrakant Pandit in the first over after tea and Raja Ali with the first ball of his next over. Harvinder Sodhi scored a 30-minute duck while Bharadwaj had 7-0-13-3 in this spell. In the second over with the new ball, taken after 80 overs, Sunil Joshi dismissed Abbas Ali and Bharadwaj took the last two wickets in a single over.

Bharadwaj's 1280 runs in the season was a new record and as of 2015, is the second highest aggregate.

Super League

Final Round - Points table
Group A

  Hyderabad and Punjab qualified for the quarterfinals.
 Punjab qualified over Bengal due to their one outright win over Bengal's none.

Group B

  Tamil Nadu and Delhi qualified for the quarterfinals.

Group C

  Karnataka and Madhya Pradesh qualified for the semifinals as the two highest scoring teams.

Knockouts

Quarterfinal 1

Quarterfinal 2

Semifinal 1

Semifinal 2

Final

Scorecards and averages
Cricketarchive

References

External links
 Ranji Trophy, 1998-99 at ESPN Cricinfo archive

1999 in Indian cricket
Ranji Trophy seasons
Domestic cricket competitions in 1998–99